Edward Bernard Morris Jr. (born May 4, 1984) is a US-born Japanese professional basketball player for the Yokohama B-Corsairs in Japan. He played college basketball for the Pittsburg State University Gorillas.

Career statistics 

|-
| align="left" | 2011-12
| align="left" | Shinshu
| 52 || 11 || 25.8 ||.576  || .208 || .532 || 6.8 ||1.3  ||0.9||0.6 || 13.0
|-
| align="left" | 2012-13
| align="left" | Shinshu
| 52 ||13 || 29.2 ||.528  || .091 || .663 || 8.5 ||2.2 ||1.0 ||0.7 || 13.7
|-
| align="left" | 2013-14
| align="left" | Tokyo CR
| 48 || 24 || 30.6 ||.495  || .361 || .556 || 8.6 ||1.5  ||1.4 ||0.5 || 15.7
|-
| align="left" | 2014-15
| align="left" | Fukushima
| 52 ||  || 24.8 ||.529  || .277 || .596 || 7.2 ||1.6  ||0.8 ||0.6 || 11.0
|-
| align="left" | 2015-16
| align="left" | Tsukuba/Saitama
| 50 || 11 || 25.8 ||.478  || .227 || .564 ||8.5 ||1.5 ||0.8 ||0.9 || 11.1
|-
| align="left" | 2016-17
| align="left" | Hachioji
| 50 || 50 || 25.2 ||.479  || .301 || .601 ||8.1 ||1.9 ||1.0 ||0.7 ||13.1
|-
| align="left" | 2017-18
| align="left" | Hachioji
| 61 || 56 || 21.1 ||.513  || .250 || .565 ||7.3 ||2.2 ||0.9 ||0.6 ||11.0
|-
|}

Trivia
He likes to build Tamiya toy cars.

References

External links
TV show

1984 births
Living people
American expatriate basketball people in Australia
American expatriate basketball people in Denmark
American expatriate basketball people in Japan
American expatriate basketball people in Spain
American men's basketball players
Cantabria Baloncesto players
Cyberdyne Ibaraki Robots players
Fukushima Firebonds players
Pittsburg State Gorillas men's basketball players
Saitama Broncos players
Shinshu Brave Warriors players
Tokyo Cinq Rêves players
Tokyo Hachioji Bee Trains players
Yokohama B-Corsairs players
Power forwards (basketball)